John III (1300 – 5 December 1355) was Duke of Brabant, Lothier (1312–1355) and Limburg (1312–1347 then 1349–1355). He was the son of John II, Duke of Brabant, and Margaret of England.

John and the towns of Brabant
The early fourteenth century, an economic boom time for Brabant, marks the rise of the duchy's towns, which depended on English wool for their essential cloth industry. During John's minority, the major towns of Brabant had the authority to appoint councillors to direct a regency, under terms of the Charter of Kortenberg granted by his father in the year of his death (1312). By 1356 his daughter and son-in-law were forced to accept the famous Joyous Entry as a condition for their recognition, so powerful had the states of Brabant become.

The marital alignment with France was tested and failed as early as 1316, when Louis X requested Brabant to cease trade with Flanders and to participate in a French attack; the councillors representing the towns found this impossible, and in reprisal Louis prohibited all French trade with Brabant in February 1316, in violation of a treaty of friendship he had signed with Brabant in the previous October.

The French alliance, 1332–1337
After his initial period of maintaining independent neutrality from both France and England failed, neighboring sovereigns in the Low Countries, stimulated as a matter of policy by Philip VI of France, became John's enemies; among the adversaries of John were the Count of Flanders, the prince-bishop of Liège, and counts of Holland and Guelders. In 1332, a crisis with the king of France arose over John's hospitality to Robert, count of Artois, during his journey to eventual asylum at the English court. In response to French pressure John reminded Philip that he did not hold Brabant from him but from God alone. A brief campaign of a coalition of Philip's friends came to a truce, followed by a pact at Compiègne by which John received a fief from Philip worth 2000 livres and declared himself a vassal of France. His oldest son, Jean, was betrothed to Philip's daughter Marie, and it was agreed that the Brabançon heir would complete his education at the French court in Paris and that Robert of Artois would be expelled from Brabant.

The support of France strengthened John's hand with his feudal suzerain, the Holy Roman Emperor. Though he was technically the Emperor's feudal vassal, John had been able to ignore Emperor Louis IV's summons to join him in his intended invasion of Lombardy (1327). The separation of Brabant from the Empire was completed by the Burgundian dukes of Brabant in the fifteenth century.

Meanwhile, the princes of the Low Countries settled their differences and formed a coalition against Brabant with a defensive alliance in June 1333. War was briefly brought to the Duchy of Brabant in the summer of 1334, but resolved by a peace brokered by Philip at Amiens. The French king declared that John had to hand over the town of Tiel and its neighbouring villages Heerewaarden and Zandwijk to the count of Guelders and to betroth his daughter Marie to the count's son, Reinoud.

The English alliance, 1337–1345
When Edward III of England decided to press his claim to the crown of France in 1337, John, who was his first cousin, became an ally of England during the first stage of the Hundred Years' War. To Edward's diplomatic offensive to draw Brabant away from France, John lent a sympathetic ear. Disrupting the staple connection between the towns of Flanders and the sources of English wool should divert it to the towns of Brabant, notably the recently established wool exchange. Edward protected Brabançon merchants in England from arrest or the confiscation of their goods, and he sweetened his offers with a promise of £60,000, an immense sum, and to make good any losses of revenue that might be confiscated by the king of France. The same month of July 1337 John promised Edward 1,200 of his men-at-arms in the event of an English campaign in France, Edward to pay their salary. In August Edward pledged not to negotiate with the king without prior consultation with the duke. The alliance, kept secret at John's insistence, came into the open when Edward landed with his troops at Antwerp July 1338. John received the promised subsidy (March 1339) and agreed in June to betroth John's second daughter, Margaret, to Edward, the Black Prince, heir to the English throne. Two seasons of inconclusive campaigning that ravaged the north of France left Edward penniless at the end of 1341; he returned home, and when he returned to the fray, it was to Brittany: he never returned to the Low Countries.

The French alliance, 1345–1355
Though John was requesting papal dispensation for the marriage of Margaret and the Black Prince in 1343, the alliance with England unravelled as Edward's coffers emptied and his attentions turned elsewhere. In September 1345 representative of France and Brabant met at the Château de Saint-Germain-en-Laye to sign preliminary agreements, and by a treaty signed at Saint-Quentin, June 1347, Brabant was retained as an ally by France. Margaret was now to marry Louis of Male, who had inherited the title of count of Flanders, but whose power against the Flemish communes was virtually nil. A point of dispute with the count of Flanders had been the Lordship of Mechelen, a strategic enclave within Brabant: it was agreed that it would now come under full Brabançon control. Despite the diplomacy of Edward, John remained true to his French commitments until his death in December 1355.

In 1350, Jews were persecuted in Brabant.

Family 
In 1311, as his father's gesture of rapprochement with France, John married Marie d'Évreux (1303–1335), the daughter of Count Louis d'Évreux and Margaret of Artois. They had six children:
 Joanna, Duchess of Brabant (24 June 1322 – 1406). Married first to William IV, Count of Holland and second to Wenceslaus I, Duke of Luxembourg.
 Margaret of Brabant (9 February 1323 – 1368), married at Saint-Quentin on 6 June 1347 Louis II, Count of Flanders
 Marie of Brabant (1325 – 1 March 1399), Lady of Turnhout, married at Tervuren on 1 July 1347 to Reginald III of Guelders.
 John of Brabant (1327–1335/36), married Marie of France (1326–1333), daughter of King Philip VI of France, but died soon after with no issue, buried in Tervueren.
 Henri of Brabant (d. 29 October 1349), Duke of Limburg and Lord of Mechelen in 1347. Died young and buried in Tervuren in 1349.
 Godfrey of Brabant (d. aft. 3 February 1352), Lord of Aarschot in 1346. Also died young and buried in Tervuren.

John also had a son born from Maria van Huldenberg, who founded the House of Brant: John I Brant, 1st Lord of Ayseau.

In 1355, after all of his three legitimate sons had died, John was forced to declare his eldest daughter Joanna his heiress, which provoked a succession crisis after his death. John III was buried in the Cistercian Abbey of Villers, Belgium. 

The standard history is Piet Avonds, Brabant tijdens de regering van Hertog Jan III (1312–1356) (Koninglijke Academie, Brussels) 1991.

Notes

Dukes of Brabant
Brabant, John III, Duke of
Brabant, John III, Duke of
House of Reginar
14th century in the duchy of Brabant
14th-century people of the Holy Roman Empire